Power Kids (5 หัวใจฮีโร่) is a 2009 Thai action film directed by Krissanapong Rachata. The film is about a group of children who team up to fight against a group of terrorists who have seized the hospital moments before their friend is about to go in for surgery. The film grossed $97,836 in Thailand and was shown at several film festivals across North America.

Release
Power Kids was released in Thailand on March 5, 2009. On its opening week, Power Kids was the fourth-highest-grossing film earning $54,715. The film earned a total of $97,836 on its theatrical run in Thailand and earned $259,677 worldwide.

Power Kids had its North American debut at the Fantasia Festival on July 12, 2009. The film had its American premiere at ActionFest in 2010.
The film was shown at the New York Asian Film Festival On July 3, 2010. Power Kids was released on DVD and Blu-ray on June 8, 2010 in North America. Bonus features on the disc include a making of the film short and a making of short.

Cast
Nantawooti Boonrapsap as Wut
Sasisa Jindamanee as Kat
Paytaaai Wongkamlao as Pong
Nawarat Techarathanaprasert as Jib
Pimchanok Luevisadpaibul as Buru
Johnny Nguyen as Terrorist Leader
Arunya Pawilai as Lek
Richard William Lord as Drunk Bully
Conan Stevens as Ambassadors Bodyguard

Reception
Twitch Film gave the film a mixed review, referring to it as "a kids' film that has no business being seen by children" and "At the same, it's filled with so many insane action beats that I'd feel remiss in not recommending it." Kung Fu Cinema criticized the movie for having inappropriate content matter for a children's movie.

Notes

External links
 
 

2009 action films
Films about terrorism in Asia
Films shot in Bangkok
Films set in Bangkok
Thai martial arts films
Muay Thai films
Thai Muay Thai films
2009 martial arts films
2009 films
Films set in hospitals
Sahamongkol Film International films
Films shot in Thailand
Thai-language films